Beatriz Pérez Lagunas (born 4 May 1991) is a Spanish field hockey midfielder who is part of the Spain women's national field hockey team.

She was part of the Spanish team at the 2016 Summer Olympics in Rio de Janeiro, where they finished eighth. On club level she plays for Club de Campo in Spain

References

External links
 
http://www.epa.eu/sports-photos/field-hockey-photos/olympic-games-2016-field-hockey-photos-52948780
http://www.hockeyccvm.com/entrevista-a-beatriz-perez/
http://www.independentsportsnews.com/2014/06/26/scotland-v-spain/
http://www.todor66.com/hockey/field/World_League/Women_2015_Round_3.html

1991 births
Living people
Olympic field hockey players of Spain
Field hockey players at the 2016 Summer Olympics
Field hockey players at the 2020 Summer Olympics
Spanish female field hockey players
Place of birth missing (living people)
Female field hockey midfielders